Larutia trifasciata, known as the three-banded larut skink, is a species of skink found in Malaysia.

References

trifasciata
Reptiles described in 1940
Taxa named by Michael Tweedie